Tomball is a city in Harris County in the U.S. state of Texas, a part of the Houston metropolitan area. The population was 12,341 at the 2020 U.S. census. In 1907, the community of Peck was renamed Tomball for local congressman Thomas Henry Ball, who had a major role in the development of the Port of Houston.

History

Settlement began in the Tomball area in the early 19th century, where settlers found an open, fertile land that received adequate rainfall—perfect conditions for farming and raising cattle. It was on a land granted in 1838 to William Hurd's heirs. In 1906 the area began to boom. Railroad line engineers often noticed that the Tomball area was on the boundary between the low hills of Texas and the flat coastal plains of the Gulf, making it an ideal location for a train stop. The railroad could load more cargo on each car, because the topography gently sloped toward the Galveston ports and provided an easier downhill coast. Thomas Henry Ball, an attorney for the Trinity and Brazos Valley Railroad, convinced the railroad to run the line right through downtown Tomball. Soon after, people came in droves to this new train stop. Hotels, boarding houses, saloons, and mercantile stores all began to spring up in the area. At first, people called the area Peck, after a chief civil engineer of the railroad line. However, on December 2, 1907, the town was officially named Tom Ball, later to be shortened to one word, for Mr. Ball.

Geophysical prospecting predicted the discovery of the Tomball Oil Field before the discovery well was drilled on 27 May 1933. The discovery produced an oil boom with many oil companies subsequently showing interest in the area. By 1935, 2,750,000 barrels of oil had been produced from 200 wells. Humble Oil Company, struck a deal with the town through which they would provide water and natural gas free of charge to the residents in exchange for rights to drill on the land. This agreement lasted until 1988.

Tomball incorporated in 1933. Because of the 1933 incorporation, Houston did not incorporate Tomball's territory into its city limits.

Geography

Tomball is located at  (30.098905, –95.618899).

Climate

The climate in this area is characterized by hot, humid summers and generally mild to cool winters.  According to the Köppen Climate Classification system, Tomball has a humid subtropical climate, abbreviated "Cfa" on climate maps.

Demographics

As of the 2020 United States census, there were 12,341 people, 4,516 households, and 2,678 families residing in the city.

At the 2019 American Community Survey, Tomball had a population of 11,778. The racial and ethnic makeup of the city was 60.8% non-Hispanic white, 9.0% Black or African American, 0.1% American Indian or Alaska Native, 0.7% Asian, 1.0% multiracial, and 29.5% Hispanic or Latin American of any race.

There was a median value of owner-occupied housing units at $211,700 and median gross rent was $1,072. Of the population, 14.3% of persons were at or below the poverty line in 2019.

At the census of 2000, there were 9,089 people living in the city. The population density was 895.4 people per square mile (345.7/km). There were 10,009 housing units at an average density of 395.0 per square mile (152.5/km). The racial makeup of the city was 86.73% White, 4.91% African American, 0.40% Native American, 0.64% Asian, 0.06% Pacific Islander, 5.57% from other races, and 1.71% from two or more races. Hispanic or Latino of any race were 12.05% of the population.

There were 14,687 households, out of which 33.8% had children under the age of 18 living with them, 44.6% were married couples living together, 13.7% had a female householder with no husband present, and 36.9% were non-families. 30.5% of all households were made up of individuals, and 12.6% had someone living alone who was 65 years of age or older. The average household size was 2.43 and the average family size was 3.03.

In the city, the population was spread out, with 25.3% under the age of 18, 10.6% from 18 to 24, 29.8% from 25 to 44, 18.6% from 45 to 64, and 15.7% who were 65 years of age or older. The median age was 35 years. For every 100 females, there were 87.1 males. For every 100 females age 18 and over, there were 83.0 males.

The median income for a household in the city was $37,787, and the median income for a family was $45,764. Males had a median income of $38,059 versus $26,799 for females. The per capita income for the city was $20,331. About 4.5% of families and 7.3% of the population were below the poverty line, including 6.3% of those under age 18 and 17.6% of those age 65 or over.

Education

Primary and secondary schools

Public schools 
Pupils who live in Tomball attend schools in the Tomball Independent School District.

The district contains eleven elementary schools (Tomball, Decker Prairie, Lakewood, Timber Creek, Creekside Forest, Creekview, Canyon Pointe, Willow Creek, Wildwood, Grand Oakes and Rosehill Elementary Schools). The schools also include a bilingual program. There are also three intermediate schools (Northpointe, Tomball Intermediate, and Oakcrest Intermedciate.   Beckendorf-closed down in 2009), four junior high schools (Creekside Park, Tomball, Willow Wood and Grand Lakes Junior High Schools), and three high schools (Tomball High School, Tomball Memorial High School, and Tomball Star Academy) within Tomball ISD. They also have the Connections Academy which includes the 18+ program.

In 2019, the Texas Education Agency released the 2018-2019 accountability ratings for school districts across the state and Tomball ISD earned an overall "A" rating. TISD earned 92 of 100 possible points overall.

Private schools 

Concordia Lutheran High School (9–12) is a private school in Tomball.

St. Anne Catholic School is a Pre-K–8 Catholic school of the Roman Catholic Archdiocese of Galveston-Houston. Established in 1984, it originally held its classes at St. Anne Church; that year it had 16 Kindergarten students and 13 first grade students. It had had 380 students in 2015. That year Joseph Noonan became the principal.

Other private schools in the greater Tomball area include Step by Step Christian School established in 1982 https://www.stepbystepchristianschool.org/, Rosehill Christian School (K–12), Salem Lutheran School, Cypress Christian School (K–12), and Great Oak School a Waldorf School (Pre-K–8). Cypress Christian, established in 1978, originally held its classes at Cypress Bible Church. It now has over 650 students. In 2018, Dr. Jeffery Potts joined CCS as Head of School. Dr. Potts was on the news for creating a School Marshall Program, where he armed teachers with guns at his previous school.

Colleges and universities 

Lone Star College (originally the North Harris Montgomery Community College District) serves the community. The territory in Tomball ISD joined the community college district in 1982. Tomball is served by Lone Star College–Tomball, a member of the Lone Star College System.

Public libraries 
A branch of the Harris County Public Library, located in Tomball College, is a joint project between the college and HCPL.

Government and infrastructure
Harris County operates a tax office at 101 South Walnut Street in Tomball.

The North Harris County Regional Water Authority form by State legislation as a taxing entity, which is located in Voting District No. 2. The Texas House of Representatives bill that created the water authority, HB 2965, was signed into law on June 18, 1999. On January 15, 2000 voters voted to confirm the creation of the authority in a special election. It taxes the cities water customers, however it does not provide water services to Tomball, as Tomball has its own water supply.  

Over 1,000 autogyros in the world are used by authorities for military and law enforcement, but the first US police authorities to evaluate an autogyro are the Tomball police, on a $40,000 grant from the U.S. Department of Justice, together with city funds, costing much less than a helicopter to buy ($75,000) and operate ($50/hour). Although it is able to land in  crosswinds, a minor accident happened due to a wind gust.

Harris County Housing Authority (HCHA) operates The Retreat at Westlock, a public housing complex for seniors, in an unincorporated area away from the Tomball city limits, along Texas State Highway 249. and near Farm to Market Road 1960. It has  of space, and has 140 units. Residents may be aged 65 or older. The complex began taking occupants in May 2017, and completion was scheduled by fall 2017. Prior to the development of the complex, residents of area subdivisions expressed opposition to the addition of low income housing in their areas. The HCHA set a ban on visitors under age 62 from being present at The Retreat at Westlock for periods longer than three days each, due to the opposition from the surrounding areas; it is, as of 2017, the only HCHA property with this rule.

The Harris Health System (formerly Harris County Hospital District) designated the Acres Homes Health Center for the ZIP code 77375. The designated public hospital is Lyndon B. Johnson Hospital in northeast Houston.

City government

On September 7, 2010, the Tomball City Council voted down a proposal to make English the official language of the city, and it voted down a measure that would have forbidden undocumented immigrants from owning and/or renting property and operating and/or owning businesses.

Postal service

The United States Postal Service operates the Tomball Post Office at 122 N Holderrieth Blvd, 77375-9998.

Healthcare

The city is served by Tomball Regional Medical Center, located at 605 Holderrieth Boulevard. It is a full-service 357-bed facility hospital providing special expertise in cardiovascular disease, cancer care, emergency services, digital diagnostic imaging, physical rehabilitation, sports medicine, and comprehensive wound and lymphedema care.  Tomball Regional Medical Care is owned by HCA Healthcare Inc.

Transportation
The city of Tomball is primarily served by FM 2920 (Main Street) east to west and State Highway 249 (Tomball Parkway) north to south.

David Wayne Hooks Memorial Airport, a general aviation airport, is located outside of the Tomball city limits in northwest Harris County. On June 27, 2007, the Texas State Legislature approved Tomball's request to annex Hooks Airport even though the airport does not border the Tomball city limits. Since the airport is in the city of Houston's extraterritorial jurisdiction, the city of Tomball had to get permission from Houston to annex the airport.

Notable people 

 Jenny Adams, track and field athlete
 Jimmy Butler, NBA basketball player
 Ray Collins, NFL defensive tackle
 Brooke Daniels, Miss Texas USA 2009
 Mike Eli, singer/songwriter of Eli Young Band
 Clint Fagan, MLB umpire
 Karlie Hay, Miss Teen USA 2016
 Charlie Hayes, former MLB infielder
 Ke'Bryan Hayes, MLB infielder for the Pittsburgh Pirates
 Keith Heinrich, former NFL player
 Chris Herrmann, MLB catcher
 Justin Jackson, NBA basketball player
 Ben Keating, racing driver and business owner
 Venric Mark, former college football player
 Jimmy Needham, contemporary Christian musician
 Chiney Ogwumike, WNBA player for the Los Angeles Sparks
 Nneka Ogwumike, WNBA player for the Los Angeles Sparks and President of the WNBPA
 Troy Patton, MLB pitcher
 David Phelps, Southern Gospel tenor
 Gary Porter, former quarterback and coach
 Debbie Riddle, former member of the Texas House of Representatives
 Dave Smith, former MLB pitcher
 Valoree Swanson, member of the Texas House of Representatives
 Nick Tremark, former MLB outfielder
 Roger Vick, former NFL player
 Sherron Watkins, former executive at Enron

Sister city
Tomball's sister city is Telgte, Germany. The two cities participate in foreign exchange student programs. The high school also receives exchange students from other areas, such as Armenia.

See also
American National Carbide
Main Street Crossing

Notes

References

External links
 City of Tomball official website

Cities in Harris County, Texas
Cities in Texas
Greater Houston
1906 establishments in Texas